Henrik Oskar Ingvar Norfeldt (born 23 December 1986) is a retired Swedish tennis player.

Career
Norfeldt has a career high ATP singles ranking of 723 achieved on 15 September 2008. He also has a career high ATP doubles ranking of 518 achieved on 14 July 2008.

Norfeldt made his ATP main draw debut at the 2008 Swedish Open in the doubles draw partnering Carl Bergman. The pair won their first round match, but lost in the second round to David Ferrer and Marc Lopez.

Norfeldt competed primarily on the Futures Circuit, winning titles in doubles.

ITF Futures titles

Doubles: (2)

References

External links

1986 births
Living people
Swedish male tennis players
Sportspeople from Gothenburg